State Highway 156, abbreviated SH-156, is a highway maintained by the U.S. state of Oklahoma. Spanning  through the north-central part of the state, it connects the town of Marland, Oklahoma to US-60/US-77/US-177 in the north to US-77 in the west. It is the former alignment of US-77.

Route description

SH-156 is designated as the 101 Ranch Memorial Road. A historical marker to the ranch is located along the highway.

History
The entirety of SH-156 was once part of US-77. US-77 was realigned and SH-156 was assigned to the old alignment on March 1, 1965. On July 14, 1969, US-60/US-77/US-177 was realigned at SH-156's north end, necessitating a slight extension northward. No further changes have taken place since 1969.

Junction list

References

External links
 SH-156 at OKHighways

156
U.S. Route 77
Transportation in Noble County, Oklahoma
Transportation in Kay County, Oklahoma